The 1985 Nigerian coup d'état was a military coup which took place in Nigeria on 27 August 1985 when a faction of mid-level Armed Forces officers, led by the Chief of Army Staff Major-General Ibrahim Babangida, overthrew the government of Major General Muhammadu Buhari (who himself took power in the 1983 coup d'état). Buhari was then detained in Benin City until 1988. Babangida justified the coup by saying that Buhari failed to deal with the country's economic problems by implementing Buharism, and promised "to rejuvenate the economy ravaged by decades of government mismanagement and corruption". Babangida then replaced the ruling Supreme Military Council (SMC) with a new Armed Forces Ruling Council (AFRC), which lasted until 1993. The regime survived a coup attempt in 1986 and 1990.

References

History of Nigeria
Military coups in Nigeria
Muhammadu Buhari
1985 in Nigeria
August 1985 events in Nigeria
1980s coups d'état and coup attempts
Conflicts in 1985